Noblesville Milling Company Mill, also known as the Model Mill, is a historic grinding mill located at Noblesville, Hamilton County, Indiana.   The original section was built about 1872, and subsequently expanded to cover 1/2 a city block.  It is a large brick structure, with the largest section being four stories tall.  It includes a water tower built about 1903.  It was originally built as a planing mill, but later converted to a grinding mill to produce flour.

It was listed on the National Register of Historic Places in 2001.

References

Grinding mills in Indiana
Grinding mills on the National Register of Historic Places in Indiana
Industrial buildings completed in 1872
Victorian architecture in Indiana
Buildings and structures in Hamilton County, Indiana
National Register of Historic Places in Hamilton County, Indiana
1872 establishments in Indiana